Poems and Prayers is Mohammed Fairouz's  third symphony. It sets texts in Arabic, Aramaic and Hebrew for choir, solo voices and orchestra and explores the Arab-Israeli Conflict. The symphony was commissioned by the Middle East Center for Peace, Culture and Development at Northeastern University. It was completed in 2010.

Instrumentation 

The symphony is scored orchestra, a mixed choir and two soloists (mezzo-soprano and baritone).

Woodwinds
2 Flutes 
2 Oboes 
2 Clarinets 
2 Bassoons 

Brass
4 French Horns in F
2 Trumpets 
3 Trombones

Percussion

Voices
Mezzo-Soprano Solo 
Baritone 
Mixed Chorus

Strings
Harp 
First and Second Violins
Violas
Violoncellos
Double basses (with low C extension).

Form

The piece consists of four movements and two interludes:

I. Kaddish 
II. Lullaby
Minyan
III. Night Fantasy
Oseh Shalom
IV. Memorial Day for the War Dead

Composition and Premiere

Poems and Prayers lasts 60 minutes. The symphony sets poetry by Israeli poet Yehuda Amichai alongside Palestinian poets Mahmoud Darwish and Fadwa Tuqan against the backdrop of the Kaddish,.

The work was given its world premiere at Columbia University's Miller Theatre.

Recording
A recording of Poems And Prayers was released together with Fairouz's clarinet concerto "Tahrir" on the Sono Luminus record label in May 2014.

Sources

External links
"NPR: Three Poetic Traditions Inspire a Mideast Symphony", NPR.
"Poems and Prayers webpage", Poems and Prayers Page.

2010 compositions
21st-century symphonies
Choral symphonies
Compositions by Mohammed Fairouz